Isabela's 3rd congressional district is one of the six congressional districts of the Philippines in the province of Isabela. It has been represented in the House of Representatives since 1987. The district consists of the west-central municipalities of Alicia, Angadanan, Cabatuan, Ramon and San Mateo. It is currently represented in the 18th Congress by Ian Paul L. Dy of the Nationalist People's Coalition (NPC).

Representation history

Election results

2022

2019

2016

2013

2010

See also
Legislative districts of Isabela

References

Congressional districts of the Philippines
Politics of Isabela (province)
1987 establishments in the Philippines
Congressional districts of Cagayan Valley
Constituencies established in 1987